Sidila Mari (Kannada: ಸಿಡಿಲ ಮರಿ) is a 1971 Indian Kannada film, directed and produced by B. S. Ranga. The film stars Udaykumar, K. S. Ashwath, Dinesh and Dwarakish in lead roles. The film had musical score by S. Rajeshwara Rao.

Cast

Udaykumar
K. S. Ashwath
Dinesh
Dwarakish
Rajanand
Nagesh
Maccheri
B. Raghavendra Rao
H.R. Shastry
Shyam
Aras
Premier Srinivas
Baby Balaraju
Jayanthi
Sadhana
Surekha
Vijayalalitha

References

External links
 

1971 films
1970s Kannada-language films
Films directed by B. S. Ranga